Sitki may refer to:

People

Sitki is a spelling of the name Sidqi.

Places

Sitki, Masovian Voivodeship, Polish village
Sitki, Silesian Voivodeship, Polish village